Alessandro Florenzi  (born 11 March 1991) is an Italian professional footballer who plays as a full-back for  club AC Milan and the Italy national team.

Florenzi started his professional club career with Roma in 2011, but spent the 2011–12 season on loan with Crotone. Florenzi was appointed as Roma's new captain following the departure of Daniele De Rossi in 2019. He later had spells on loan with Spanish side Valencia, and French side Paris Saint-Germain, winning the Trophée des Champions and the Coupe de France with the latter club during the 2020–21 season.

At international level he was a member of the Italy national under-21 football team that finished second in the 2013 UEFA European Under-21 Championship, and also represented the Italy senior side at UEFA Euro 2016 and UEFA Euro 2020, winning the latter tournament.

Club career

Roma
A product of Roma youth academy, Florenzi made his serie A debut in a 3–1 win against Sampdoria on 22 May 2011, replacing Francesco Totti as a substitute.

Loan to Crotone
During the summer of 2011, Florenzi was sent on loan to Serie B club Crotone. He made his debut on 27 August 2011, scoring their goal in a 2–1 home defeat against Livorno. On 22 June 2012, Crotone exercised the option in the loan contract to buy half of the registration rights for €250,000. On 6 July, Roma bought back half of the registration rights for €1.25 million.

Return to Roma
Florenzi made his first appearance of the 2012–13 Serie A season as a second-half substitute in the 2–2 draw against Catania on 26 August 2012. He made his first start in the 3–1 victory against Internazionale the following week, also scoring his first-ever goal for Roma. Florenzi ended his first full season with the Roma first team, making 36 Serie A appearances and scoring three goals. On 31 July 2013, Florenzi scored and assisted a goal in a 3–1 over the MLS All-stars in the 2013 MLS All-Star Game, and was named the MLS All-Star Game MVP.

During the 2013–14 Serie A season, Florenzi helped guide Roma to a second-place finish and a return to Champions League football for the first time since the 2010–11 season. Florenzi also featured in all ten of Roma's victories from the start of the season, a Serie A record, scoring against Livorno, Parma, Bologna and Inter during the run. On 12 January 2014, Florenzi scored a fantastic, bicycle kick goal to open the scoring in Roma's 4–0 victory against Genoa. Florenzi played in 36 of Roma's 38 Serie A fixtures during the season.

Florenzi made his first appearance of the 2014–15 Serie A season on 30 August 2014 as a second-half substitute in the 2–0 victory against Fiorentina. He then started the 0–1 away victory against Empoli on 13 September. Florenzi made his Champions League debut as a substitute for the injured Juan Iturbe in the 5–1 group stage victory against CSKA Moscow on 17 September. Florenzi scored his first goal of the season as Roma won 2–0 against Cagliari, having set up Mattia Destro for the opener.

On 16 September 2015, Florenzi scored the tying goal from 50 yards out against reigning champions, Barcelona when he spotted the goalkeeper at the edge of his box during the group stage of the Champions League, resulting in a 1–1 draw. The goal was later named one of the three final nominees for the 2015 FIFA Puskás Award.

On 26 October 2016, Florenzi suffered an anterior cruciate ligament injury in his left knee during Roma's 3–1 away win against Sassuolo, causing him to be out for at least four months. On 17 February 2017, Florenzi was ruled out for the rest of the season after suffering a further tear of the same ligament in his first week back in training. On 16 September 2017, he made his return in Roma's 3–0 home victory over Hellas Verona.

Loan to Valencia
On 30 January 2020, Florenzi was loaned to Valencia CF until 30 June 2020.

Loan to Paris Saint-Germain
On 11 September 2020, Florenzi joined Ligue 1 club Paris Saint-Germain on a season-long loan with an option to buy. He was given the number 24 shirt. Two days later, he made his debut for PSG in a 0–1 loss against Marseille. On 2 October 2020, Florenzi scored his first goal at the Parisian club, in a match against Angers that ended in a 6–1 victory.

On 19 May 2021, Florenzi started for PSG in their 2–0 win over Monaco in the 2021 Coupe de France Final. His loan ended on 30 June 2021.

Loan to AC Milan: Scudetto Triumph
On 21 August 2021, AC Milan announced the signing of Florenzi from Roma on an initial loan deal, with the option to make the transfer permanent. Florenzi signed for the team until 30 June 2022. On First of October, Florenzi underwent surgery to his partially torn medial meniscus in his left knee. He was back on the pitch almost after 2 months against Fiorentina.

He scored his first goal for Milan on 22 December against Empoli in eventual 4–2 win, it was also his first goal from a free-kick in Serie A.
On 6 April 2022, he underwent a surgery on his left knee to repair the internal meniscus.
On 8 May against Verona, he played his first match since the injury, coming on as a substitute and scoring the third in 3–1 win for Milan.
In total, Florenzi played 30 matches for Milan this season, scoring 2 goals, contributing to the club's 19th Scudetto; it was Florenzi's first Serie A title.

AC Milan 
On 1 July 2022, AC Milan announced the signing of Florenzi from Roma on a permanent basis. The defender has signed a contract with the club lasting until 30 June 2025.

International career
On 14 November 2012, Florenzi made his debut for the senior team under coach Cesare Prandelli in a friendly match against France.

Florenzi was part of the Italy under-21 squad for the 2013 UEFA European Under-21 Championship in Israel, as the Azzurrini reached the final, losing to Spain 4–2. Florenzi's only goal of the tournament came in the 4–0, group stage, victory over the host nation.

On 15 October 2013, Florenzi scored his first senior goal on his competitive debut in a World Cup qualifying match against Armenia that ended in a 2–2 draw at the Stadio San Paolo in Naples. Florenzi was not included in the 30-man preliminary squad named by Cesare Prandelli for the 2014 FIFA World Cup.

On 30 August 2014, new Italy head coach Antonio Conte named Florenzi in his first squad for the upcoming European qualifying matches. On 31 May 2016, he was named to Conte's 23-man Italy squad for UEFA Euro 2016.

In June 2021, he was included in Italy's squad for UEFA Euro 2020 by manager Roberto Mancini. On 11 July, Florenzi won the European Championship with Italy following a 3–2 penalty shoot-out victory over England at Wembley Stadium in the final, after a 1–1 draw in extra-time; he made a substitute appearance during the final, replacing Emerson Palmieri late in the second half of extra-time.

Style of play
Florenzi is a tenacious, tactically intelligent and well-rounded player who is extremely versatile. Although initially he was usually deployed as a central midfielder, in the "mezzala" role, he is a box-to-box player capable of playing anywhere in midfield, and he has recently also been deployed as a winger, and even as an attacking full-back or wing-back on either flank throughout his career, although he favours the right side. Florenzi is a quick, energetic and hard-working player who is effective at aiding his team both offensively and defensively due to his pace and stamina; when used in more offensive midfield roles, he has also demonstrated an aptitude for making offensive runs. He is gifted with good technical skills, distribution, and crossing ability, and despite his small stature, he is effective in the air; he is also a good striker of the ball, and an accurate set-piece taker. Florenzi has cited Cesc Fàbregas as his role model.

Career statistics

Club

International

Scores and results list Italy's goal tally first, score column indicates score after each Florenzi goal.

Honours
Paris Saint-Germain
Coupe de France: 2020–21
Trophée des Champions: 2020

AC Milan
Serie A: 2021–22

Italy U21
UEFA European Under-21 Championship runner-up: 2013

Italy
UEFA European Championship: 2020

Individual
Pallone d'Argento: 2015–16

Orders
 5th Class / Knight: Cavaliere Ordine al Merito della Repubblica Italiana: 2021

References

External links

 Profile at the AC Milan website
 
 
 Statistics at Italian Footballers' Association
 
 Profile at the Italian FA website
 

1991 births
Living people
Footballers from Rome
Italian footballers
Italy youth international footballers
Italy under-21 international footballers
Italy international footballers
Association football defenders
A.S. Roma players
F.C. Crotone players
Valencia CF players
Paris Saint-Germain F.C. players
A.C. Milan players
Serie A players
Serie B players
La Liga players
Ligue 1 players
UEFA Euro 2016 players
UEFA Euro 2020 players
Italian expatriate footballers
Expatriate footballers in Spain
Expatriate footballers in France
Italian expatriate sportspeople in Spain
Italian expatriate sportspeople in France
UEFA European Championship-winning players
Knights of the Order of Merit of the Italian Republic